Carabus henningi is a species of ground beetle in the Carabinae subfamily that can be found in Mongolia and Russia.

References

henningi
Beetles described in 1817